Mykolaiv River Port is an inland port of Mykolaiv located on the left bank of the Southern Bug River, 40 km upstream from the confluence of the river with the Dnieper estuary.

See also

List of ports in Ukraine
Transport in Ukraine

References

Transport companies established in 1882
Buildings and structures in Mykolaiv Oblast
Ports of Mykolaiv
River ports of Ukraine